St. Albans is a city in Kanawha County, West Virginia, United States, at the confluence of the Kanawha and Coal rivers. The population was 10,861 at the 2020 census.

History
St. Albans was laid out in 1816. Originally, it was known as Philippi, after Philip Thompson, an early settler, the name afterwards being changed to Colesmouth due to the area and river being discovered by Samuel Cole. The city was then incorporated as Kanawha City in 1868. The town was renamed in 1872 by H.C. Parsons of the C & O Railroad in honor of his birthplace in St. Albans, Vermont, which is itself named after St. Albans in Hertfordshire, England. The latter town is named for St. Alban, believed to have been the first British Christian martyr.

Geography

Demographics

2010 census
As of the census of 2010, there were 11,044 people, 4,969 households, and 3,073 families living in the city. The racial makeup of the city was 94.0% White, 3.4% African American, 0.3% Native American, 0.5% Asian, 0.3% from other races, and 1.6% from two or more races. Hispanic or Latino of any race were 0.8% of the population.

There were 4,969 households, of which 25.7% had children under the age of 18 living with them, 45.4% were married couples living together, 12.1% had a female householder with no husband present, 4.3% had a male householder with no wife present, and 38.2% were non-families. 33.7% of all households were made up of individuals, and 16.5% had someone living alone who was 65 years of age or older. The average household size was 2.21 and the average family size was 2.79.

The median age in the city was 45 years. 19.5% of residents were under the age of 18; 6.5% were between the ages of 18 and 24; 23.9% were from 25 to 44; 29.4% were from 45 to 64; and 20.6% were 65 years of age or older. The gender makeup of the city was 46.9% male and 53.1% female.

2000 census
As of the census of 2000, there were 11,567 people, 5,185 households, and 3,390 families living in the city. The population density was 3,196.0 people per square mile (1,233.7/km2). There were 5,467 housing units at an average density of 1,510.5 per square mile (583.1/km2). The racial makeup of the city was 95.37% White, 2.84% African American, 0.13% Native American, 0.43% Asian, 0.18% from other races, and 1.05% from two or more races. Hispanic or Latino of any race were 0.63% of the population.

There were 5,185 households, out of which 23.5% had children under the age of 18 living with them, 51.6% were married couples living together, 10.6% had a female householder with no husband present, and 34.6% were non-families. 31.4% of all households were made up of individuals, and 17.1% had someone living alone who was 65 years of age or older. The average household size was 2.21 and the average family size was 2.75.

In the city, the population was spread out, with 19.2% under the age of 18, 6.8% from 18 to 24, 25.2% from 25 to 44, 25.2% from 45 to 64, and 23.6% who were 65 years of age or older. The median age was 44 years. For every 100 females, there were 85.6 males. For every 100 females age 18 and over, there were 81.5 males.

The median income for a household in the city was $37,130, and the median income for a family was $47,913. Males had a median income of $35,978 versus $25,030 for females. The per capita income for the city was $19,806. About 4.9% of families and 8.2% of the population were below the poverty line, including 12.3% of those under age 18 and 7.2% of those age 65 or over.

Education
 Saint Albans High School (9-12)
 Hayes Middle School (6-8)
 McKinley Middle School (6-8)
 Alban Elementary (K-5)
 Central Elementary (K-5)
 Anne Bailey Elementary (K-5)
 George C. Weimer Elementary (K-5)
 Lakewood Elementary (K-5)

Infrastructure

Transportation

Highways
 U.S. Route 60
 West Virginia Route 817

Bus
The Kanawha Valley is served by Kanawha Valley Regional Transportation Authority (KRT).

Notable people 
 Randy Barnes, Olympic shot putter, 1996 gold medalist
 George E. Deatherage,  political agitator and nationalist
 Renee Montgomery, former WNBA player who is currently a part-owner of the Atlanta Dream and the FCF Beasts
 Brett Nelson, American Basketball player and coach
 Jason Rader, American football player

Notable places 

St. Albans Public Library (member of the Kanawha County Public Library System)

References

 
Cities in West Virginia
Cities in Kanawha County, West Virginia
Populated places on the Kanawha River
Charleston, West Virginia metropolitan area
Populated places established in 1816
1816 establishments in Virginia